Helenius is both a surname and a given name. Notable people with the name include:

People with the surname
Ari Helenius (born 1944), Finnish professor of biochemistry
Jani-Petteri Helenius (born 1990), Finnish professional ice hockey player
Juhani Helenius (born 1933), Finnish sprint canoeist
Nicklas Helenius Jensen (born 1991), Danish professional football forward
Riku Helenius (born 1988), ice hockey goaltender
Robert Helenius (born 1984), Finnish professional boxer
Sami Helenius (born 1974), ice hockey defenceman

People with the given name
Helenius Acron, Roman commentator and grammarian, probably of the 5th century
Helenius de Cock (born 1835), instructor at the Theological School, Kampen, Overijssel, Netherlands

See also
Hilkka Rantaseppä-Helenius (1925–1975), Finnish astronomer

nl:Helenius